Ilya Ilf (Ilya Arnoldovich Feinsilberg or , 1897–1937) and Yevgeny Petrov (Yevgeniy Petrovich Katayev or , 1902–1942) were two Soviet prose authors of the 1920s and 1930s. They did much of their writing together, and are almost always referred to as "Ilf and Petrov". They were natives of Odesa.

The duo were arguably the most popular satirical writers in the Soviet period. representatives of the "Odesa School" of humorist writers, and some of the very prominent, mostly Jewish  (Odesa native) cultural figures along with Isaac Babel and Leonid Utesov, who moved to work in the Soviet capital after the abolishment of restrictions on Jewish residence in the Pale of Settlement.

Publications 

Ilf and Petrov gained a high profile for their two satirical novels: The Twelve Chairs (1928) and its sequel, The Little Golden Calf (1931). The two texts are connected by their main character, Ostap Bender, a con man in pursuit of elusive riches. Both books follow exploits of Bender and his associates looking for treasure amidst the contemporary Soviet reality. They were written and are set in the relatively liberal era in Soviet history, the New Economic Policy of the 1920s. The main characters generally avoid contact with the apparently lax law enforcement. Their position outside the organized, goal-driven, productive Soviet society is emphasized. It also gives the authors a convenient platform from which to look at this society and to make fun of its less attractive and less Socialist aspects. These are among the most widely read and quoted books in Russian culture. The Twelve Chairs was adapted for ca. twenty movies; in the Soviet Union (by Leonid Gaidai and by Mark Zakharov), in the US (in particular by Mel Brooks) and in other countries.

From the late 1920s to 1937, the co-authors wrote several theatrical plays and screenplays, as well as many humorous short stories and satirical articles in the magazines Chudak, 30 days, Krokodil and Ogoniok; and the newspapers Pravda and Literaturnaya Gazeta. In the first years of joint creativity Ilf and Petrov published their stories and satires under parodic pseudonyms: Tolstoevsky (composed of the names of writers Tolstoy and Dostoevsky), Don Busilio (from Don Basilio, a character in the opera The Barber of Seville, and the Russian verb busa – scandal, noise), Cold philosopher and others.

The two writers also traveled across the Great Depression-era United States. Ilf took many pictures throughout the journey, and the authors produced a photo essay entitled "American Photographs", published in Ogoniok magazine. Shortly after that they published the book Одноэтажная Америка (literally: "One-storied America"), translated as Little Golden America (an allusion to The Little Golden Calf). The first edition of the book did not include Ilf's photographs. Both the photo essay and the book document their adventures with their characteristic humor and playfulness. Notably, Ilf and Petrov were not afraid to praise many aspects of the American lifestyle in these works while being highly critical about others. The title comes from the following description.

Vladimir Nabokov considered them to be "wonderfully gifted writers".

Ilf died of tuberculosis a few months after their return from the USA. Petrov became a front line correspondent during the Second World War and, after covering the fighting in Sevastopol, was killed when the airplane he was travelling in back to Moscow crashed while flying low to avoid anti-aircraft fire.

Script authors 
 Woman-Sycophant – comic play (1930, “Подхалимка”)
 House-Barracks – screenplay (1931, “Барак”)
 Strong Feeling – vaudeville (1933, “Сильное чувство”)
 Under the Circus Dome – comic play (1934, with Valentin Kataev, “Под куполом цирка”)

In culture 
The minor planet 3668 Ilfpetrov, discovered by Soviet astronomer Lyudmila Georgievna Karachkina in 1982, is named after them.

Bibliography
 
 
 
 
 
 
 
  (A translation of the eleven-part "American Photographs" photo-essay originally published in Ogoniok)

Notes and references

External links

 .
  (first chapter of "American Photographs," translated into English as Ilf and Petrov's American Road Trip )
 .
 .

 
Writers from Odesa
Russian humorists
Soviet novelists
Soviet male writers
20th-century Russian male writers
Soviet short story writers
20th-century short story writers
Russian satirists
20th-century pseudonymous writers